Giulia Conti (born 4 November 1985 in Rome) is an Italian sailor.

Biography
She has competed in four successive Summer Olympic Games.

Conti is a member of the Circolo Canottieri Aniene sailing club.

She made her Olympic debut at 19, at the 2004 Athens Olympics, sailing in the yngling class with Alessandra Marenzi and Angela Baroni. Subsequently she represented Italy at Beijing 2008 (with Giovanna Micol in the Women's 470 class), at London 2012 (again with Micol in the 470 class) and Rio 2016 (with Francesca Clapcich in the 49erFX class). Her results include two fifth places in the 470 and another fifth place in the 49erFX.

In 2008, she and Micol won silver at the 470 World Championships.

Since she has competed with Francesca Clapcich. The pair scored numerous successes in the newly formed class 49er FX class, including 2015 victory in Italian, European and World Championships. On 27 October 2015 Conti and Clapcich were awarded the Golden Collar sporting merit award, the highest honor conferred by CONI.

In 2016, they came second at the European Championships.

Achievements

See also
Italy at the 2012 Summer Olympics

References

External links
 
 
 
 Giulia Conti at CONI
 Giulia Conti at ESPN 2012 Olympics website

1985 births
Living people
Sportspeople from Rome
Italian female sailors (sport)
World champions in sailing for Italy
49er FX class sailors
49er FX class world champions
Olympic sailors of Italy
Sailors at the 2004 Summer Olympics – Yngling
Sailors at the 2008 Summer Olympics – 470
Sailors at the 2012 Summer Olympics – 470
Sailors at the 2016 Summer Olympics – 49er FX
21st-century Italian women